Clearing house or Clearinghouse may refer to:

Banking and finance
 Clearing house (finance)
 Automated clearing house
 ACH Network, an electronic network for financial transactions in the U.S.
 Bankers' clearing house
 Cheque clearing
 Clearing House (EU), an EU intelligence body
 Clearing House Association, a New York trade group and banking association
 Clearing House Automated Transfer System (HK), a real-time gross settlement system in Hong Kong
 The Clearing House Payments Company, an American check clearing and wholesale funds transfer company
The Clearing House, its parent organization
 Bank Policy Institute, an entity which subsumed the Clearing House Association, a former arm of The Clearing House
 Clearstream, a post-trade services provider
 Euroclear, a Belgian financial services company
 New York Clearing House, first and largest U.S. bank clearing house
 Pan-European automated clearing house

Other uses
 Clearing House, California
 WAC Clearinghouse, publishes open-access journals, books, and other resources
 Access to Information Central Clearing House (UK)
 Central Register and Clearing House, an administrative organization in teacher education in England and Wales

See also
 Clearing (finance)